BCG may refer to:

Astronomy 
 Blue compact galaxy
 Brightest cluster galaxy

Medicine and biochemistry 
 BCG vaccine (Bacillus Calmette–Guérin), for tuberculosis
 Ballistocardiography, measuring heart forces
 Bromocresol green, a dye and pH indicator

Companies
 Beijing Capital Group, China
 Boston Consulting Group
 Buffalo Creek and Gauley Railroad (BC&G), Clay County, West Virginia, US

Other uses 
 BCG matrix, for product line analysis
 Billy Gillispie, American basketball coach
 Bolt, carrier group in a firearm
 British Comedy Guide
 Big City Greens, show on the Disney Channel
 "Birth control glasses", common dysphemism for GI glasses